The Assumption Church on Sennaya Square in St. Petersburg was a Late Baroque penticupolar church underwritten by Orthodox merchants trading at the nearby Sennaya Square market. 

The church originated as a wooden building transferred across the Neva from the northern part of the city. It was rebuilt in stone in the 1750s to a Rastrelliesque design attributed to Andrey Kvasov and was slightly modified on several occasions, most importantly by Luigi Rusca in 1817. The church boasted a high belfry of three storeys, a gilded icon screen, and many valuable items. Its parish was one of the richest in the city.

The large building with the distinctive dark-green jug-like domes, popularly known as the Saviour Church, used to dominate the surrounding district. It gave its name to Spassky Island (the central parcel of the downtown wedged between the Fontanka, Moika, Griboyedov and Kryukov canals) and Spasskaya metro station.

The building survived the Joseph Stalin period intact and was even elevated by the Living Church to a cathedral status (in 1923) but was blown up at the height of Nikita Khrushchev's anti-religious campaign in 1961. A metro vestibule that was to replace it stands slightly to the north. The site of the church has been marked by a very small and plain-looking chapel since 2003.

References

Sources

Russian Orthodox churches in Saint Petersburg
Demolished churches in the Soviet Union
Baroque church buildings in Russia
Churches completed in 1761
18th-century Eastern Orthodox church buildings
Buildings and structures demolished in 1961
18th-century churches in Russia
Cultural heritage monuments of regional significance in Saint Petersburg